The Laister-Kauffman CG-10 was an American military transport glider aircraft developed during World War II.

Design and development
The development version was known as XCG-10. This version could carry 30 troops. It was accepted on October 4, 1943. The first test tow flight took place on November 6, 1943. The second version, XCG-10A, increased seating capacity to 42 and added a rear loading door.

The production version, CG-10A, had an initial order of 990 with the intention of being used for the planned invasion of Japan. 90 were on the production line when the program was cancelled.  Laister-Kauffman considered fitting the planes with two Pratt & Whitney R-1830-92 engines but this plan never came to fruition.

Specifications (XCG-10A)

See also

Operators

United States Army Air Forces

References

CG-10
Waco CG-13
1940s United States military gliders
CG-13
Aircraft first flown in 1943
High-wing aircraft